Centroderidae is a family of worms belonging to the class Cyclorhagida.

Genera:
 Campyloderes Zelinka, 1907
 Centroderes Zelinka, 1907
 Condyloderes Higgins, 1969

References

Kinorhyncha